Route 198 is a 132 km two-lane highway which cuts through the Appalachian Mountains in the Gaspé Peninsula, Quebec, Canada. It acts both as a shortcut to get to Gaspé without having to go through many small villages and steep climbs on Route 132, and it also is the only link to Murdochville, the one municipality along this long stretch of highway. Route 198 starts at the junction of Route 132 in L'Anse-Pleureuse and ends again at the junction of Route 132 in Gaspé.

Municipalities along Route 198
 Saint-Maxime-du-Mont-Louis
 Mont-Albert
 Murdochville
 Collines-du-Basque
 Rivière-Saint-Jean
 Gaspé

See also
 List of Quebec provincial highways

References

External links  
 Québec Official Road Map

198
Roads in Gaspésie–Îles-de-la-Madeleine
Transport in Gaspé, Quebec